Soul Deep may refer to

 Soul Deep (Jimmy Barnes album), 1991
 Soul Deep (Sizzla album), 2005
 Soul Deep, an album by Noora Noor, 2009
 "Soul Deep" (The Box Tops song), 1969
 "Soul Deep" (Roxette song), 1987
 "Soul Deep", a song by the Council Collective, 1984